Roda Island (or Rawdah Island,   ) is an island neighbourhood in the Nile in central Cairo, alternatively or partially known as Manial al-Roda, or al-Manial, in reference to the main village that existed on the island before it was urbanised, and is part of the Misr al-Qadima district.

History

During the reign of caliph Sulaymān ibn ʿAbd al-Malik of the Umayyad dynasty, a nilometer was built on the southern tip of the island opposite the mouth of the Khalij canal in AD 715 to measure the annual Nile flood. The structure was replaced in AD 861, during the reign of the Abbasid caliph al-Mutawakkil, overseen by the astronomer Alfraganus, and despite a number of modifications, is still extant today and known as the Roda Island Nilometer.

The Ayyubid Sultan as-Salih Ayyub (Reigned 1240 to 1249, great-nephew of Saladin) built a palace at the southern tip of the island near the nilometer. 

The mamluk Bahri dynasty originally settled on Roda Island at the palace.The name of the dynasty, "Bahriyya",  means 'of the river', referring to their original settlement on the island on the Nile.

The Bostan al-Kebir (Great Gardens) started to be planned and grown on the island in 1829 by Viceroy Ibrahim Pasha, of the Muhammad Ali Dynasty. In 1851  the Manasterly Palace, also known as the Kiosk  was built on the island's southern tip on the ruins of the Ayyubid palace for Hassan Fouad Pasha Al-Manasterly, Katkhoda of Egypt during the reign of Abbas I. Later in the early 20th Century the Prince Muhammad Ali Palace was built in the island's mid-north. 

Today, the island is a bustling neighbourhood of Cairo.

Gallery

References

External links 

The Al-Manyal Palace Museum and gardens
  Wikivoyage.org: Rōḍa - on Wikivoyage.org

Islands of the Nile
River islands of Egypt
Ayyubid architecture in Egypt